The 2015–16 Aruban Division di Honor season is the 55th season of top-tier football in Aruba.

Teams

Brazil Juniors who finished in 10th place last season were relegated to the Aruban First Division Division Uno. Caravell were promoted from the First Division Division di Honor.

Regular season

Caya 4

Final
First Leg [Jun 15]
Dakota 0-1 RCA             

Second Leg [Jun 19]
RCA 1-0 Dakota          

Third Leg [Jun 23; if necessary]
Dakota          n/p RCA           

Aruban Division di Honor seasons
Aruba
football
football